Barney Rappaport (March 25, 1900 – October 12, 1970) was an American orchestra leader and jazz musician from the 1920s to the 1940s. Rapp married Ruby Wright in 1936.

References

1900 births
1970 deaths
American jazz bandleaders
Burials at Spring Grove Cemetery
Musicians from New Haven, Connecticut
Musicians from Cincinnati
RCA Victor artists
20th-century American musicians
Jazz musicians from Ohio
Jazz musicians from Connecticut